Khlong Saeng is a wildlife sanctuary in southern Thailand, in western Surat Thani Province. The wildlife sanctuary is named after the river (khlong) Saeng, a tributary of the Phum Duang River.

The sanctuary includes an area of 1,155 km2 of Khiri Rat Nikhom District and Ban Ta Khun District, north of Khao Sok National Park and Ratchaprapha Dam. Most lowland areas in the Khlong Saeng valley were flooded with the construction of the dam and the creation of Cheow Lan Reservoir. This now flooded area was the only site in Thailand where Storm's stork (Ciconia stormi) was confirmed to breed in 1986. Khlong Saeng is believed to be the habitat of about 200 wild elephants and 400 gaur. The population of clouded leopards and Asian golden cats is thought to have increased. In 2019, cameras were installed in the sanctuary to take pictures of endangered and protected animals in a 750,000-rai area north of the Ratchaprapha Dam. Photos captured rare animals such as clouded leopards and Asian golden cats. Traces of other rare animals such as black tigers and leopards were also found.

Sources

External links
Forestry department (Thai only)
Gazette entries for Khlong Saeng (Thai only)
Issue 91, Part 216 (18. December 1974)
Issue 100, Part 67 (28. April 1983)
Issue 102, Part 154 (24. October 1985)
Issue 103, Part 77 (8. May 1986)
 ASEAN Center for Biodiversity

Wildlife sanctuaries of Thailand
Tenasserim Hills
Geography of Surat Thani province
Protected areas established in 1974
1974 establishments in Thailand